
Groovy is a slang colloquialism popular during the 1960s and 1970s, specifically music with a propulsive rhythmic "feel" or sense of "swing".

Groovy may also refer to:

Music 
 Groovy (album), a 1957 album by jazz pianist Red Garland and his trio
 Groovy, a 1994 album by Ghanaian musician Kojo Antwi
 "Groovy", a song by Pet Shop Boys from the 2016 album Super

People 
 Winston Groovy (born 1946), Jamaican reggae singer

Sports 
 Groovy (horse) (foaled 1983), an American Thoroughbred Champion sprint racehorse

Technology 
 Groovy (programming language), a 2003 programming language for the Java platform

See also
 Groove (disambiguation)